Events from the year 1950 in the United Kingdom.

Incumbents
Monarch – George VI
Prime Minister – Clement Attlee (Labour)
Parliament
 38th (until 3 February)
 39th (starting 1 March)

Events
 12 January – submarine  sinks after collision in the Thames Estuary with 64 deaths (mostly from hypothermia) and 20 survivors.
 16 January – the BBC Light Programme first broadcasts the daily children's radio feature Listen with Mother.
 26 January
 India becomes a republic, severing ties with the United Kingdom.
 Donald Hume is sentenced to imprisonment as an accessory to the murder of Stanley Setty, having dumped his dismembered body over the Essex marshes from a light aircraft.
 8 February – George Kelly is sentenced to hang for the murder of the Cameo cinema manager in the Liverpool suburb of Wavertree, a conviction which will be quashed as unsafe fifty-three years later.
 20 February – Ealing Studios release the film The Blue Lamp, introducing the character PC George Dixon, played by Jack Warner (with Dirk Bogarde as a young criminal).
 21 February – Cunard liner  arrives at the scrapyard in Faslane at the end of a 36-year career.
 23 February – the 1950 general election is held. Labour is defending a triple-figure parliamentary majority in government, but their popularity took a plunge last year following the devaluation of the pound, and the failure of the groundnuts scheme, with many recent opinion polls showing a comfortable Conservative lead. BBC Television broadcasts its first election results programme, however no footage survives due to it being broadcast live and thus, was never recorded in the first place.
 24 February – Clement Attlee wins the general election, giving Labour a second term in government after their election triumph five years earlier, in 1945. However, he retains power with a majority of just five seats, a stark contrast to the 146-seat majority that he gained previously. Among the lost Labour seats is Bexley in Kent, which 33-year-old Conservative Party candidate Edward Heath seizes from Ashley Bramall. Both Communist Party MP's lose their seats. University constituencies have been abolished at the dissolution. Voter turnout is 83.9%, an all-time high for a UK general election under universal suffrage.
 1 March – the German-born theoretical physicist Klaus Fuchs, working at Harwell Atomic Energy Research Establishment, is convicted following a confession of supplying secret information about the atomic bomb to the Soviet Union.
 6–8 March – the World Figure Skating Championships are held in London.
 8 March
 Carmaker Rover tests a revolutionary new turbine-powered concept car.
 Release of comedy film The Happiest Days of Your Life starring Alastair Sim and Margaret Rutherford.
 9 March – Welsh-born Timothy Evans, aged 25, is hanged by Albert Pierrepoint at HM Prison Pentonville in London for the murder of his baby daughter (and, by imputation, his wife) at their residence at 10 Rillington Place in Notting Hill, London; 3 years later, his downstairs neighbour John Christie is found to be a serial killer of at least seven women at this address; Evans is posthumously pardoned in 1966.
 12 March – Llandow air disaster: eighty of the eighty-three passengers on board an Avro Tudor V aircraft are killed when it crashes on approach to Llandow in Glamorgan, making it the world's worst air disaster at this time.
 16 March – The Gambols comic strip first appears in the Daily Express.
 c. April? – The best-selling Kenwood Chef food mixer is first introduced.
 1 April – Corby, a village in Northamptonshire, is designated as the first new town in central England, providing homes for up to 40,000 people by the 1960s.
 14 April – the Eagle comic first appears, featuring Dan Dare and Captain Pugwash.
 29 April – Arsenal F.C. win the FA Cup with a 2–0 win over Liverpool at Wembley Stadium.
 13 May – first Grand Prix held at Silverstone.
 20 May – first package holiday air charter, by Vladimir Raitz of Horizon Holidays, from Gatwick Airport to Calvi, Corsica, for camping.
 21 May – a tornado tracks across England from Wendover to Blakeney, Norfolk, the longest ever such track in Britain.
 26 May – motor fuel rationing comes to an end after eleven years, marking another stage in the phasing-out of rationing that was introduced in the wake of the Second World War.
 6 June – the BBC Light Programme first broadcasts the popular radio comedy feature Educating Archie.
 7 June – pilot episode of the series The Archers broadcast on BBC Radio. It will still be running 70 years later.
 24 June – World Cup opens in Brazil with the England national football team competing for the first time.
 28 June – in the World Cup, the England national football team is humiliated by losing 1–0 to the United States in Belo Horizonte.
 29 June – the England cricket team loses the Test Match by 326 runs to the West Indies at Lord's, an event commemorated in Lord Beginner's calypso Victory Test Match.
 11 July – first broadcast of the popular BBC Television pre-school children's programme Andy Pandy.
 19 July – release of the film Treasure Island made in England with Robert Newton as Long John Silver.
 31 July
 Sainsbury's opens the first purpose-built supermarket, at Croydon.
 Warwickshire's Eric Hollies beats Nobby Clark's record of 65 innings without reaching double figures when dismissed for 7 against Worcestershire. Hollies will eventually make it 71 before scoring 14 against Nottinghamshire on 16 August.
 15 August – Princess Elizabeth gives birth to her and her husband, The Duke of Edinburgh's second child and only daughter.
 19 August – the Football League season begins with four new members, taking membership from 88 to 92 across the four divisions. The new members are Colchester United, Gillingham (who lost their league status in 1938), Scunthorpe & Lindsey United and Shrewsbury Town.
 24 August – Vale Park football stadium opens in Stoke-on-Trent, to serve Port Vale F.C. It has an initial capacity of more than 30,000; it had been billed as the "Wembley of the North" when first proposed, but high costs mean that the new stadium is much more basic than had been planned.
 27 August – the BBC makes its first television broadcast from the European continent.
 29 August
 4,000 British troops are sent to Korea.
 Princess Elizabeth and the Duke of Edinburgh's fourteen-day-old infant daughter is named as Anne Elizabeth Alice Louise. She is known at this time as Princess Anne of Edinburgh, and later as The Princess Royal.
 8 September – 116 miners are trapped underground in a landslide at Knockshinnoch Castle colliery at New Cumnock in Ayrshire, Scotland.
 9 September
 Post-war soap rationing ends.
 The first miners are rescued from Knockshinnoch Castle colliery.
 11 September – the rescue operation from Knockshinnoch Castle colliery is completed, with all 116 miners saved.
 1 October – full-time military service by conscripted National Servicemen is extended to two years.
 18 October – the North of Scotland Hydro-Electric Board's Loch Sloy Hydro-Electric Scheme is inaugurated.
 25 October – the Festival Ballet, later to become the English National Ballet, founded by Alicia Markova and Anton Dolin, makes its debut performance.
 26 October – the rebuilt House of Commons, following its destruction by bombing in World War II, is used for the first time.
 October
 Alan Turing's paper Computing machinery and intelligence, proposing the Turing test, is published in Mind.
 A group of Conservative politicians publishes the tract One Nation: a Tory approach to social policy.
 November – attempt to hold the Second World Peace Congress at Sheffield City Hall is thwarted by the British authorities preventing many international delegates from entering the country and it is relocated to Warsaw.
 5 November – the BBC Light Programme first broadcasts Life with the Lyons, the UK's first sitcom, featuring British-domiciled American couple Bebe Daniels and Ben Lyon.
 28 November – James Corbitt is hanged at Strangeways Prison, Manchester, for the premeditated murder in August of his mistress at Ashton-under-Lyne; he is well acquainted with his executioner Albert Pierrepoint in Pierrepoint's other calling as a pub landlord in Oldham.
 10 December
Bertrand Russell wins the Nobel Prize in Literature "in recognition of his varied and significant writings in which he champions humanitarian ideals and freedom of thought".
 Cecil Frank Powell wins the Nobel Prize in Physics "for his development of the photographic method of studying nuclear processes and his discoveries regarding mesons made with this method".
 25 December – the Stone of Scone, the traditional coronation stone of Scottish monarchs, English monarchs and more recently British monarchs, is stolen from London's Westminster Abbey by a group of four Scottish students with nationalist beliefs. It turns up in Scotland on 11 April 1951.
 28 December – an order to designate the Peak District as the first of the National parks of the United Kingdom is submitted to the Minister of Town and Country Planning for approval.

Undated
 Ysgol Syr Thomas Jones opens in Amlwch on Anglesey as Britain's first purpose-built comprehensive school.
 Construction of Shoeburyness Boom, a Cold War submarine defensive boom across the Thames Estuary, begins.

Publications
 Agatha Christie's Miss Marple novel A Murder is Announced.
 Catherine Cookson's first novel Kate Hannigan.
 William Cooper's novel Scenes from Provincial Life.
 Marion Crawford's royal biography The Little Princesses: the Story of the Queen's Childhood by her Nanny.
 Elizabeth David's recipe book A Book of Mediterranean Food.
 C. S. Forester's novel Mr. Midshipman Hornblower.
 Doris Lessing's novel The Grass is Singing.
 C. S. Lewis's novel The Lion, the Witch and the Wardrobe, first of The Chronicles of Narnia series (16 October).
 Mervyn Peake's novel Gormenghast, second of the eponymous series.
 Barbara Pym's novel Some Tame Gazelle.
 Evelyn Waugh's novel Helena.

Births

 1 January – Chris Black, Scottish hammer thrower
 2 January – Angela Gallop, forensic scientist
 5 January – Malcolm Hardee, comedian (died 2005)
 7 January – Malcolm Macdonald, footballer and manager
 19 January – David Tredinnick, politician
 1 February – John Bowe, actor
 4 February – Pamela Franklin, actress
 13 February – Peter Gabriel, musician
 16 February – Peter Hain, politician
 19 February – Andy Powell, rock guitarist (Wishbone Ash)
 22 February – Julie Walters, English actress
 22 March – Jocky Wilson, Scottish darts player (died 2012)
 27 March – Terry Yorath, footballer and football manager
 30 March – Robbie Coltrane, Scottish actor and comedian (died 2022)
 3 April – Sally Thomsett, actress
 20 April – Robert Mair, engineer and academic
 22 April
 Peter Frampton, rock singer-songwriter
 Jancis Robinson, wine writer
 1 May – Danny McGrain, footballer
 3 May – Mary Hopkin, singer
 11 May – Jeremy Paxman, television presenter and author
 12 May – Jenni Murray, radio presenter
 15 May – Keith Mills, businessman
 17 May – Alan Johnson, politician
 22 May
 Mary Tamm, actress (died 2012)
 Bernie Taupin, songwriter
 23 May – Martin McGuinness, Irish republican politician and soldier (died 2017)
 1 June – Tom Robinson, singer and musician
 2 June
 Jonathan Evans, Welsh lawyer and politician
 Anne Phillips, theorist and academic
 5 June – Paul Flowers, Labour politician and non-executive chairman of The Co-operative Bank
 13 June – Nick Brown, politician
 14 June – Rowan Williams, Archbishop of Canterbury
 30 June 
 Olly Flynn, race walker
 Leonard Whiting, actor
 4 July – Philip Craven, 2nd President of the International Paralympic Committee
 6 July – Jonathon Porritt, English environmentalist and academic
 8 July – Sarah Kennedy, television presenter
 14 July – Bruce Oldfield, fashion designer
 18 July – Richard Branson, entrepreneur
 19 July – Simon Cadell, actor
 23 July
 Len McCluskey, trade unionist
 Paul Patrick, gay rights activist (died 2008)
 26 July – Susan George, actress
 27 July – Simon Jones, actor
 30 July – Harriet Harman, politician
 13 August – Jane Carr, actress
 15 August – Anne, Princess Royal
 18 August – Dennis Elliott, drummer
 20 August – Andrew Downes, composer (died 2023)
 11 September – Barry Sheene, motorcycle racer (died 2003 in Australia)
 14 September – Paul Kossoff, blues rock guitarist (Free) (died 1976)
 21 September – Charles Clarke, politician
 27 September – Linda Lewis, née Fredericks, pop singer
 5 October – Eddie Clarke, heavy metal guitarist (Motörhead) (died 2018)
 22 October – Harry Gration, broadcaster  and journalist (died 2022)
 25 October – Steve Barry, race walker
 14 November – Sarah Radclyffe, production manager and producer
 17 November – Colin Fletcher, suffragan bishop
 26 November – Davey Graham, guitarist (died 2008)
 6 December – Helen Liddell, politician
 10 December – Nicky Henderson, horse trainer
 14 December – Vicki Michelle, actress
 20 December – Geoffrey Grimmett, mathematician and academic
 21 December – David Thacker, director and screenwriter
 28 December – Clifford Cocks, cryptographer
 31 December – Phil Blakeway, English rugby player

Deaths
 21 January – George Orwell, author (born 1903)
 9 March – Timothy Evans, victim of wrongful execution (born 1924)
 19 March – Sir Norman Haworth, chemist, Nobel Prize laureate (born 1883)
 24 March – Harold Laski, political theorist and economist (born 1893)
 30 March – Joe Yule, Scottish-born comedian (born 1894)
 19 April – Edward Unwin, Victoria Cross recipient (born 1864)
 2 August – Nina Boucicault, actress (born 1867)
 17 August – Sir Francis Lindley, diplomat (born 1872)
 6 September – Olaf Stapledon, author and philosopher (born 1886)
 21 September – Arthur Milne, physicist (born 1896)
 2 November – George Bernard Shaw, playwright (born 1856)
 12 November – Julia Marlowe, English-American actress (born 1865)
 23 November – Percival Mackey, pianist, composer and bandleader (born 1894)
 28 November – James Corbitt, murderer (born 1913)

See also
 1950 in British music
 1950 in British television
 List of British films of 1950

References

 
Years of the 20th century in the United Kingdom